The Mission Continues, formerly Center for Citizen Leadership, is a 501(c)(3) nonprofit organization that empowers veterans facing the challenge of adjusting to life at home to find new missions. Founded in 2007 by Republican politician Eric Greitens, The Mission Continues "redeploys veterans in their communities, so that their shared legacy will be one of service and success.

History
The Mission Continues was founded in 2007, after CEO Eric Greitens returned home from service in Iraq as a Navy SEAL. Upon his return, Eric visited with wounded Marines at Bethesda Naval Hospital in Maryland.  Many Marines expressed a  desire to continue serving their country, even if they could no longer do so in the military. Inspired, Greitens founded The Mission Continues. As of May 2014, The Mission Continues had awarded more than 1,000 fellowships since it began operations.

Greitens stepped down as CEO in July 2014 to pursue political aspirations in Missouri; Mary Beth Bruggeman is the President.

Programs

Service Platoon Program
The organization's Platoon Program mobilizes teams of veterans, active duty service members, guardsmen and reservists to solve a specific challenge in their community. As of March 2020, there are over 80 service platoons active in over 50 cities.

Mass Deployment
Mass Deployment, an event that brings together veterans from across the country for a week of high-impact service projects in one community, Every year, a new Mass Deployment city is selected with a goal of jump-starting long-term transformational change, having served in Detroit, Atlanta's Westside, the Watts neighborhood of Los Angeles, and South Baltimore.

Service Leadership Corps
The Service Leadership Corps is a six-month, community-based leadership program that combines in-person and online learning with real-world applications. The goal is to equip program participants with relevant skills to serve as a community leader. Starting in 2020, the program has two tracks, the traditional one continues to meet in person while the new virtual track offers remote learning for a more flexible participation experience.

Women Veterans Leadership Program
In April 2016, The Mission Continues launched the first Women Veterans Leadership Summit in New Orleans and due to its success, it was pivoted towards a full-fledged program,  the organization launched the Women Veterans Leadership Program.  This program brings together a cohort of women veterans from all eras for a five-month program, designed to support women by identifying their unique leadership pathways, strengthening their existing leadership skills, and creating a nationwide network of like-minded women.

Awards
The organization has been  named one of the 50 Best Nonprofits to Work For in 2012, 2013 and 2014 by The NonProfit Times, a "Best Place to Work" from Outside in 2013 and 2014,  the 2011 Innovation Award Winner from the Social Venture Network, the 2012 TORCH Award from the Better Business Bureau of Eastern Missouri and Southern Illinois, a 2009 Draper Richards Fellowship from the Draper Richards Kaplan Foundation and the 2011 Best of Bullseye Award for Collaboration from Target.

Political controversy 
Eric Greitens was accused of improperly taking The Mission Continues list of donors and his campaign was fined in 2015. On April 20, 2018, Greitens was charged with felony computer data tampering, related to the same incident. The charges were later dropped.

See also
 Team Rubicon

References

External links
  The Mission Continues
  2012 Annual Report
  MSNBC Profile on The Mission Continues

Non-profit organizations based in St. Louis
American veterans' organizations
Organizations established in 2007
2007 establishments in Missouri